Gary Proud (born July 30, 1943) is an American politician who served in the New York State Assembly from the 131st district from 1977 to 1990.

A graduate of the Rochester Institute of Technology, his tattoos were featured in the RIT Reporter.

He founded the Gamma Nu chapter of Phi Kappa Tau at RIT.

References

1943 births
Living people
Democratic Party members of the New York State Assembly
Rochester Institute of Technology
Phi Kappa Tau